The Hong Kong Adventure Corps is a voluntary uniformed group subsidised by the Hong Kong government and the Hong Kong Jockey Club. It was created in 1995 with ties to the British Army's Army Cadet Force and Combined Cadet Force. Like the Hong Kong Sea Cadet Corps and Hong Kong Air Cadet Corps, the HKAC exists to serve the Hong Kong community. The HKAC's values are based in those of the British Army, providing a tough and challenging training with a distinctive military tone of discipline and esprit de corps.

History 
Founded in 4 September, the HKAC succeeded the Royal Hong Kong Regiment's Junior Leader Corps (J Corps) in 1995 after the disbandment of the RHKR(V) and its J Corps in the same year. The RHKR(V) J Corps was created in 1971 by then colonial government and had the same mission as the current HKAC. The J Corps had a maximum strength of 300 members and was divided into two units: J1 Squadron and J2 Squadron. Unlike the HKAC, which trains both boys and girls, the RHKR J Corps accepted boys only.

"The Ninety Nine" and "The Nine"

The Hong Kong Volunteers in 1854 had its first establishment of 99 Europeans to defend Hong Kong, while the HKAC has its owned cadets of 9 in the first intake of recruits in 1995. This become the Corps' tradition to toast for the Ninety Nine and the Nine after the toast to HM and the people in its Foundation Day Dinner.

Training 
The HKAC is an army-orientated and disciplined youth organisation that aims to promote qualities of responsibility, self-reliance, resourcefulness, endurance, perseverance and a sense of service to the community, as well as developing its cadets' leadership and social awareness. The Corps is now an Operating Authority of the Hong Kong Award for Young People (Duke of Edinburgh Award in Hong Kong) (DEA).

The Corps Headquarters is in High Island, Sai Kung District, and was given to the Corps by the Hong Kong Government. The facility was formerly a British army camp. Another training camp, also located in High Island, was formerly a correctional facility and detention centre for Vietnamese refugees.

Among its members, the HKAC aims to provide:

 Challenges to stimulate potential
 Discipline to cultivate autonomy
 Demand to initiate growth

Training activities at the camp include:

 General/Basic training
 Drill & Parade
 Fitness & Adventure training
 Field-crafts
 Indoor Air Rifles Shooting Programme

Field Training activities like tactics, night walk and camp craft are always conducted in the countryside nearby. Chong Hing (High Island) and Tai Mei Tuk (Tai Po) Water Sports Centre are often used by sabre unit for water sports activities.

Unit training also proceeded in those schools with an affiliation to the Corps.

In the period from 1995 to 2009, former British Forces Camp, the Burma Lines Camp (Queen's Hill, Faniling) were used for training also.

Organisation 

CHQ/Council 
Chairman of Council and Honorary Commandant – Mr Norman Yeung
Commandant – Colonel Matthew Wong ED
Deputy Commandant (Operations & Training) – Lieutenant Colonel CK Kwong
Deputy Commandant (Support & Development) – Lieutenant Colonel KK Chung
Chief staff Officer – Lieutenant Colonel Kent Cheuk
Adjutant – Captain - KO Au
Corps Liaison Officer – Captain Charlie Lee
Corps Sergeant Major – WO1 CC Lee
Senior Warrant Officer – WO1 YH Chan
Cadet Sergeant Major – CWO2 
Junior Leader Wing (Under DC(O&T))
OC A Squadron – Major HW Tam
OC B Squadron – Major KL Ma
OC C Squadron – Major KL Chiu
OC D Squadron – Major YH Ng
OC E Squadron – Major MW Fung
OC F Squadron – Major SW Lau
OC H Squadron – Major Patrick Chan
OC S Squadron – Major Tom Lai
OC Trg Squadron – Major WK Mak
OC SL Squadron – Dissolved
OC MKP Squadron – Major PY Cheng
OC HD Squadron – Captain SM Leung
Headquarter Units (Under DC(S&D))
OC Adventure Training Team – Major WY Lam
OC Central Training Team – Major Stephen Yiu
OC Corporate Communications Team – Major TC Mak
OC Medical Troop – Major Danny Wong
OC Signal Troop – Capt Sunny Chan
OC Guard Troop – Dissolved
DMus Band –
Band

Ranks

Officers

Other Ranks (Adult members)

Other Ranks (Cadets)

Qualifications 
The age range for joining the HKAC is between 11 and 21, and new members are given the rank of Recruit. Recruits who attain sufficient training are qualified to the rank of Cadet after Passing Out Parade. Cadets may be promoted to the following ranks:
 Cadet Lance Corporal
 Cadet Corporal
 Cadet Sergeant
 Cadet Staff Sergeant
 Cadet Warrant Officer Class Two

Junior Dragon Squadron (JDS) were established on 2014 which recruits children aged 9 or above, training strength were lowered for them. When the members of JDS reached 11, they can become recruit and received further training from sabre unit.

Besides the rank system, the Corps also has a skill qualification system that recognizes the skills of its members, and awards badges regardless of rank. These badges can be worn on a brassard while in uniform. The available badges are:

First Aider Badge (Badge holder must be the 'trained person' stated in the HK Laws Cap. 509 Occupational and Safety Ordinance)
Guard of Honour Badge
Marksman Badge (Air rifles)
Marksman Badge (Full-bore)
Bandsman Badge

Uniform 

The HKAC dress uniform is similar to the British Army dress uniform. Inheriting the tradition from its parent regiment, the Royal Hong Kong Regiment, there are some slight differences between uniforms worn by the Army and Corps members.

The HKAC badge is similar to the badge of the Royal Hong Kong Regiment, with two dragons facing each other. The crown in the badge was replaced by a bauhinia after the 1997 handover.

HKAC members cannot wear uniform when:
Engaging in a paid employment not associated with HKAC.
Engaging in political activities.
Participating in sports events (unless authorised by HKAC).

Cadet must wear the beret/headgear at any time, except:
Sitting
Eating or Drinking
At work and on board public transport
In a hangar

Ceremonial Dress 

By tradition, cadet members wear dark blue berets as their headgear, while adult members wear No.1 Cap when this dress is worn. Scarlet Red Sash is worn by all Senior Non-commissioned Officers (Sergeant or above). WO1s and Officers will wear Sam Browne belt and carry infantry pattern (1897)sword if necessary; the Corps Sergeant Major and Senior Warrant Officer will also carry a regulation pattern Pace Stick as part of uniform. Other ranks will not carry bayonet frogs and will not mount bayonets onto their arms.

Some Non-commissioned officers will choose to wear Ammo Boots while Officers will wear Oxford-style parade shoes.

Band issues their own kilt with tartan to the Pipeband members. Drum Major carry mace on parade.

Warm Weather Service Dress (Officers only)

Field Dress 

Since the Corps was a sub-unit of Royal Hong Kong Regiment, DPM is adopted as field dress by the Corps. Dark blue berets with red flash (for cadet members) and green flash (for adult members) are worn as headdress. Jungle hats can be worn in field with authorisations from the unit commander.

Adult members who had military force service experiences might own sets of No.9 uniform, issued by both RHKR(V) and HKMSC. Others may buy DPM field dress themselves. Cadet members wear a pair of Olive Green lightweight trousers instead of DPM lightweight trousers. Combat Soldier 95 (CS95) shirts were restricted by the Corps as the system adopt rank slides instead of epaulettes. However, some members modified the shirts, putting epaulettes tapes onto the uniform to meet the standard of the Corps. Also, olive-green brassards used by Regular Army in early-1980s are adopted by the Corps, instead of rank patches used in late-1980s and early-1990s.

Mess Dress 

Mess Dress is only available for adult members. Female members wear black mess jackets and black evening dresses, which is specially designed, unlike the "cavalry style" jacket adopted by the Regular Army.

General Service (GS)/Barrack Dress 

Khaki long-sleeved shirt is worn by all members when they are in GS/ Barrack Dress. In summer time, sleeves are rolled up above elbow level. In winter time, olive-green pullovers or Combat Smock jackets can be worn, based on the orders from the commanders.

For GS Dress, olive green lightweight trousers are worn with high-leg boots. For Barrack dress, bottle-green barrack trousers (for male members) and skirt (for female members) are worn with Oxford-style parade shoes or ankle boots.

Stable belts or olive green working belts can be worn, based on the orders from the commanders. Cadet members are unauthorised to wear Barrack dress.

Service Dress 

The Corps adopted the Service Dress in FAD (Future Army Dress of British Army) style to the adult members in both officer and other ranks in early 2012 and is now replacing the olive green barrack trousers.

Equipment 
The Corps uses equipment handed down after the disbanding of the Royal Hong Kong Regiment in 1995:
 Deactivated L1A1 SLR
 PLCE Webbing System

In addition, a number of M16A3 and L85A1 replica weapons are in the armoury of the Corps, which are used as aids for teaching field-crafts and skill-at-arms.

Two Russian BTR-70 APCs confiscated by the Hong Kong Customs and Excise Department in an illegal shipment in 2000 are on display at the High Island Training Camp.

Fleet 
The Corps has 11 vehicles in service, with most of them donated by the Hong Kong Jockey Club Charities Trust. The Home Affairs Bureau has also provided subsidies to replace two rubber boats used for water activities.

Types of vehicles:
 MPV
 Light Tender
 28 seater Coach
 Rubber boat

Awards 
The Hong Kong Adventure Corps issues its own awards to its members that are not a part of the government issued orders, decorations, and medals of Hong Kong. The medals and clasps are modelled after those awarded by the British Army, and a lanyard with the Corps' colours are awarded to members receiving the following commandant commendations:

 Hong Kong Cadet Forces Medal for Distinguished Service
 Hong Kong Cadet Forces Medal for Meritorious Service
 First Clasp to the Hong Kong Cadet Forces Medal
 Hong Kong Cadet Forces Medal (for 10 Year Long Service)
 Hong Kong Adventure Corps Commandant Commendation

To encourage members who served the Corps, the Corps provides scholarships to members who received years of training upon being admitted to local universities as full-time students.

Exchange Trips 
The HKAC cadets are often visited by fellow army cadet corps from other countries and they in turn visit corps in other countries from time to time.

Recruitment 
Recruit all year round since late 2017. Before that, the Corps inducts teenagers aged between 11 and 21 (inclusive) from March to May every year. Selections are conducted before the start of recruit training. The annual Passing Out Parade is held in the following year's April for recruits who pass the Recruit Basic Training Course.

The Corps begins receiving online application for cadets and instructor since 2017 and 2018 respectively to cope with society needs.

See also 
 Hong Kong Sea Cadet Corps
 Hong Kong Air Cadet Corps
 Ceremonial Squadron
 Royal Hong Kong Regiment (The Volunteers)
 Sea Cadet Corps
 Air Training Corps
 Army Cadet Force

References

External links 
 RHKR The Volunteers Association
 HKAC

1995 establishments in Hong Kong
Army cadet organisations
Youth organisations based in Hong Kong
Youth organizations established in 1995